Bushby is a surname. Notable people with the surname include:

 Adrian Bushby (active 21st century), British recording engineer
 Bill Bushby (born 1935), English cricketer
 Bill Bushby (footballer) (1914–1997), English footballer
 David Bushby (born 1965), Australian diplomat
 Edward Bushby (1817–1856), English cricketer
 Karl Bushby (born 1969), British ex-paratrooper, walker and author
 Max Bushby (1927–1994), Australian politician
 Michael Bushby (1931–2020), English cricketer
 Perc Bushby (1919–1975), Australian rules footballer
 Robert Bushby (1927–2018), American aircraft mechanic and aviator
 Thomas Bushby (1911–1983), American football player
 William Bushby (1864–1936), Australian rules footballer

Other uses
 Anthony Bushby Bacon (1772–1827), British industrialist
 Margaret Bushby Lascelles Cockburn (1829–1928), Indian-born artist and amateur ornithologist

See also
 Bushby Midget Mustang, a light aircraft
 Bushby Mustang II, a light aircraft